Ayla Algan (born 29 October 1937) is a Turkish film/stage actress and singer.

Biography
Ayla Algan was born in Istanbul and spent her childhood in France where she studied at Lycée Notre Dame de Sion Istanbul and Versailles Lycee. Then she moved to the USA, where she joined the New York Actors Studio as an actress. Later, she joined the Language and Culture Center in Turkey and worked as a theatre actress and instructor. After film and theatre, she started a singing career.

References

External links
 
 Alya Algan's Discogs profile
 Ayla Algan at Last.fm
 Ayla Algan's SinemaTürk profile

1937 births
Living people
Actresses from Istanbul
Turkish film actresses
Turkish stage actresses
Turkish women singers
Turkish pop singers
Singers from Istanbul
20th-century Turkish actresses
Lycée Notre Dame de Sion Istanbul alumni